Jastrzębniki may refer to the following places:
Jastrzębniki, Kalisz County in Greater Poland Voivodeship (west-central Poland)
Jastrzębniki, Nowy Tomyśl County in Greater Poland Voivodeship (west-central Poland)
Jastrzębniki, Świętokrzyskie Voivodeship (south-central Poland)
Jastrzębniki, West Pomeranian Voivodeship (north-west Poland)